Kazem Gholami (born 21 March 1957) is an Iranian wrestler. He competed in the men's freestyle 100 kg at the 1992 Summer Olympics, finishing 9th.

References

External links
 

1957 births
Living people
Iranian male sport wrestlers
Olympic wrestlers of Iran
Wrestlers at the 1992 Summer Olympics
Place of birth missing (living people)
Asian Games bronze medalists for Iran
Asian Games medalists in wrestling
Wrestlers at the 1986 Asian Games
Medalists at the 1986 Asian Games
Asian Wrestling Championships medalists
21st-century Iranian people
20th-century Iranian people